The 2018–19 Austrian Regionalliga  was the 60th season of the Austrian third-tier football league.

The Regionalliga is split into East, West and Middle (German: Ost, West & Mitte) divisions. The Regionalliga Ost is formed by clubs from the Vienna, Lower Austria and Burgenland Football Associations. The Regionalliga Mitte is made up of clubs from the Upper Austria, Carinthia and Styria Football Associations. The Regionalliga West is made up of clubs from the Salzburg, Tirol and Vorarlberg Football Associations.

Regionalliga Ost

Regionalliga Mitte

Regionalliga West

See also
 2018–19 Austrian Football Bundesliga
 2018–19 Austrian Football Second League
 2018–19 Austrian Cup

External links
Regionalliga Ost at Worldfootball.net
Regionalliga Mitte at Worldfootball.net
Regionalliga West at Worldfootball.net

Austrian Regionalliga seasons
2018–19 in Austrian football
Aus